Danielle Charest (1951 – October 13, 2011) was a Quebecois writer, a major figure in the Canadian radical lesbianism movement.

Charest was born in Sherbrooke, Quebec, in 1951. She graduated from the School for Advanced Studies in the Social Sciences in Paris, having written her thesis on gender relations in crime fiction. She subsequently obtained a higher degree in history, focusing on the treatment of lesbians and gay men in crime novels. Charest subsequently worked various odd jobs: folk singer, apple picker, house painter, cook in a fast-food restaurant, taxi driver, horseback riding teacher for children, and French teacher for adults. These experiences helped inspire some of her later works.

She co-directed a documentary film about violence against young girls, published several novels, and wrote in 1993 Ma maison, mon taxi, a biography of Fernande Chartrand, a taxi driver. In 1982, she co-founded as part of a lesbian collective in Montreal the quarterly radical lesbian magazine Amazones d'Hier, Lesbiennes d'Aujourd'hui.

She led debates on various subjects, published articles online, and contributed to Lesbia Magazine. Her book Haro sur les fumeurs, jusqu'où ira la prohibition? ("Haro on Smokers: How Far Will Prohibition Go?"), published in 2008, studies the progression of anti-smoking laws in France in the international context. According to Charest, efforts to punish smokers are part of a larger framework of moralism that could have far broader implications. Charest died in October 2011 at the Paris House for Women, a feminist collective, at age 60, after suffering an aneurism.

Selected works

Crime novels 

 L'Érablière, 1998
 L'Échafaudage, 1999
 L'Étouffoir, 2000
 L'Entrave, 2002
 Conte à rebours, 2003 (second edition in 2012)

Other works 

 Ma maison, mon taxi, 1993
 Mais où est mais, 2000
 Tabac : Vérités et mensonges, 2006
 Lettreinfo, 2008
 Haro sur les fumeurs, jusqu'où ira la prohibition ?, 2008
 L'Enchilada, 2011

See also 

 Amazones d'Hier, Lesbiennes d'Aujourd'hui

References 

1951 births
2011 deaths
Canadian novelists in French
Canadian women novelists
Crime novelists
Writers from Sherbrooke
Canadian feminists
Canadian LGBT rights activists
Canadian lesbian writers
20th-century Canadian novelists
20th-century Canadian women writers
21st-century Canadian novelists
21st-century Canadian women writers
21st-century Canadian LGBT people